is a 1992 compilation album by Yellow Magic Orchestra.

Track listing
 Lotus Love (from Naughty Boys)
 Chaos Panic (from Naughty Boys)
 Key (from Technodelic)
 Cue (from BGM)
 Computer Game (from Yellow Magic Orchestra)
 Pure Jam (from Technodelic)
 Nice Age (from X∞Multiplies)
 Lighten Up 
 Rydeen (from Solid State Survivor)
 Megamix: Yellow Magic Orchestra in the 90's

Personnel
Ryuichi Sakamoto - keyboards, vocals
Yukihiro Takahashi - drums, electronic drums, vocals
Haruomi Hosono - bass, vocals

Yellow Magic Orchestra albums
Alfa Records albums
1992 compilation albums